Aliciella is a genus of plants in the phlox family. These plants have been treated as members of genus Gilia until recently, when it was proposed they be moved back to Aliciella. This genus was created in 1905 to include certain gilias that seemed distinct from most of the others, but it was abandoned soon after. Recent genetic analyses suggest it should be revived.

Selected current species:
Aliciella caespitosa - Rabbit Valley gilia
Aliciella formosa - Aztec gilia
Aliciella haydenii - San Juan gilia
Aliciella heterostyla - cactus flat gilia
Aliciella hutchinsifolia - desert pale gilia
Aliciella latifolia - broad-leaved gilia
Aliciella leptomeria - sand gilia
Aliciella lottiae - Lott's gilia
Aliciella micromeria - dainty gilia
Aliciella nyensis - Nye gilia
Aliciella penstemonoides - Black Canyon gilia
Aliciella pinnatifida - sticky gilia
Aliciella ripleyi - Ripley's gilia
Aliciella sedifolia - stonecrop gilia
Aliciella subacaulis - pinyon gilia
Aliciella subnuda - coral gilia
Aliciella tenuis - Mussentuchit Creek gilia
Aliciella triodon - coyote gilia

Genus Aliciella was named for the botanist Alice Eastwood.

References

External links

 
Flora of the Western United States
Taxa named by Alice Eastwood
Polemoniaceae genera